Singers in the Shadows is a collection of poems by Robert E. Howard. It was published in 1970  by Donald M. Grant, Publisher, Inc. in an edition of 549 copies.  The collection was reprinted by Science Fiction Graphics, Inc.  in 1977.

Contents

 Introduction, by Glenn Lord
 "Zukala's Hour"
 "Night Mood"
 "The Sea–Woman"
 "The Bride of Cuchulain"
 "The Stranger"
 "Shadows"
 "Rebel"
 "White Thunder"
 "The Men That Walk With Satan"
 "Thus Spake Sven The Fool"
 "Sacrifice"
 "The Witch"
 "The Lost Galley"
 "Hadrian's Wall"
 "Attila Rides No More"
 "The Fear That Follows"
 "Destination"
 "The Tavern"
 "The Road to Hell"
 "The Twin Gates"

References

1970 poetry books
American poetry collections
Poetry by Robert E. Howard
Donald M. Grant, Publisher books
Fantasy poetry